Eliezer (Eli) Marom ("Chayni") (born in 1955, Sde Eliezer, Upper Galilee, Israel) is the former Commander of the Israeli Navy serving from 2007–2011. As of 2015 he serves as the head of the Israel Airports Authority. 

Born in Sde Eliezer, Israel, Marom is of Chinese descent. He held the rank of Aluf in the Israeli Navy.

Early life and family
Marom was born and raised on moshav Sde Eliezer, in the Hula Valley. His father Erik was a German-born Jew and his mother Leah (originally Chai Li) was born in China, the daughter of a Russian-Jewish woman and a Han Chinese man who had converted to Judaism. His parents met when his father escaped to China as a refugee from Europe during World War II. He was the seventh of his parents' eight children and was born weeks after his family immigrated to Israel.

Marom studied Marine Engineering in the Israel Nautical College in Akko. While he studied there, one of his commanders called him "Chayni" because of his eyes, and that became his nickname. He began his career in the Israeli Navy in 1975 after completing a naval officers course.

Career
Over the course of his career, Marom has held most of the senior positions in the Israeli Navy. According to Haaretz, Marom is widely praised for his abilities as a commander, but concerns about his character led to him being passed over as head of the Navy in 2004. However, Marom was finally appointed to the post in 2007. He was charged with rehabilitating the Navy after the 2006 Lebanon War, in the wake of a Hezbollah missile strike on INS Hanit.

In March 2009, Marom was embroiled in a scandal after he was caught partying at a strip club in Tel Aviv. MK Nachman Shai called for Marom's resignation and IDF Chief of Staff Gabi Ashkenazi verbally rebuked him for his behavior. Ashkenazi did not, however, attach a reprimand to Marom's personal file.

Marom was still head of the navy during the 2010 Gaza flotilla raid. In June 2011, as the Free Gaza Movement was preparing to launch Freedom Flotilla II to Gaza, Marom was quoted as calling the action a 'hate flotilla'.

After leaving the navy in 2011, he became involved in many projects, and serves as Senior Director at Seagull Maritime Security.

In October 2013, he was briefly detained for questioning over his role in the Gaza flotilla raid when he arrived at Heathrow Airport, during a visit to the United Kingdom.

Personal life
Eliezer Marom is married to Ora and has three children.

Timeline
 Israel Navy Advanced Command Course
 National Defense College
 U.S. Navy Senior International Defense Management Program
Harvard Business School
 MA in Social Sciences from Haifa University
 1975 Joins Israeli Navy as Engine Officer
 1999 promoted as Rear Admiral and appointed Commander of the Haifa Naval Base and the North Arena
 2001 appointed the Head of Naval Operations of the Israel Navy
 2003 appointed Chief of Staff of the Israel Navy
 2004-2005 IDF representative at the United States Joint Forces Command.
 August 2005 appointed Defense Armed Forces Attache at the Embassy of Israel in Singapore
 October 9, 2007 promoted to vice admiral and Commander in Chief of the Israel Navy.

References

1955 births
Living people
Harvard Business School alumni
Israeli Jews
Israeli Navy generals
Israeli people of Chinese descent
Israeli people of German-Jewish descent
Israeli people of Russian-Jewish descent
University of Haifa alumni
Naval attachés